Coquillettidia (Coquillettidia) crassipes is a species complex of zoophilic mosquito belonging to the genus Coquillettidia.

Distribution
It has a wide range of distribution from west to east. It is found in Sri Lanka, Australia, Bangladesh, Cambodia, China, Fiji, Guam, Hong Kong, India, Indonesia, Japan, Laos, Malaysia, Mariana Islands, Myanmar, Nepal, New Guinea (Island); Papua New Guinea, Pakistan, Philippines, Thailand, Vietnam, Ryukyu, Irian Jaya, and Maluku.

Description
Female with brownish antenna, maxillary palpus, clypeus, and proboscis with violet sheen. Scutum yellowish, with narrow golden scales. Wings with narrow dark scales of purple reflections. Femora yellowish at base and purplish on apical parts. Male has maxillary palpus longer than proboscis.

Parasites
Niles et al 1965 finds C. crassipes to be a natural vector of Plasmodium gallinaceum. It also vectors various other avian malaria organisms in Africa.

Medical importance
It is a secondary vector of Brugian filariasis, a host to Cardofilaria nilesi.

References

Further reading

External links
Laboratory colonization and life cycle of Coquillettidia crassipes in Malaysia.
Field studies on the surveillance of Coquillettidia crassipes (Van der Wulp) and the isolation of a strain of Cardiofilaria in peninsular Malaysia.
Coquillettidia Dyar, 1905 - Mosquito Taxonomic Inventory

crassipes